The Royal Society of Literature Giles St Aubyn Awards for Non-Fiction are annual awards, granted by  Royal Society of Literature (RSL), to authors engaged in writing their first non-fiction book for a mainstream audience. The prize provides additional time or resources for writing or research, as well as raising the profile of the book when published.

Recipients must have a publishing contract and be citizens of either the UK or Ireland, or have been residents in one of these for at least the last three years.

The award was established in 2017, and secured in perpetuity through a bequest from author and RSL Fellow Giles St Aubyn. The awards replace the earlier RSL Jerwood Award, which existed from 2004 to 2016 and which was funded by the Jerwood Charitable Foundation.

Recipients

2020
 Doreen Cunningham for Soundings: A Journey with Whales, Virago, 2022 (£10k)
 Alice Sherwood for The Authenticity Playbook, Harper Collins, 2022 (£5k)
 Danny Lavelle for Down and Out: A Journey Through Homelessness, Wildfire, 2022 (£2,500)
The 2020 awards were judged by Damian Le Bas, Ramita Navai and Fiona St Aubyn.

2019
 Harry Davies for Operation Information, The Bodley Head, 2021 (£10k)
 Olive Heffernan for The High Seas: The Race to Save the Earth’s Last Wilderness, Profile Books, 2021 (£5k)
 Judges’ Special Commendation: Rebecca Fogg for Beautiful Trauma, Granta, 2022
The 2019 awards were judged by Fiona St Aubyn (Chair), Rachel Hewitt and Kenan Malik.

2018
 Laurence Blair for Lost Countries of South America: Travels in a Continent’s Past and Present, The Bodley Head, 2020 (£10k)
 Lily Le Brun for Looking to Sea: Britain Through the Eyes of its Artists, Hodder and Stoughton, 2020 (£5k)
 Judges’ Special Commendation: Paul Craddock for Dragon in a Suitcase: A Cultural History of the Art of Transplant, Fig Tree, 2020
The 2018 awards were judged by: Iain Sinclair (Chair), Laura Bates, Aida Edemariam and Fiona St Aubyn.

2017
 David Farrier for Footprints: In Search of Future Fossils, 4th Estate, 2019 (£10k)
 Lisa Woollett for Scavenging, John Murray, 2019 (£5k)
 Judges’ Special Commendation: Joanna Jolly for Red River Girl: The Life and Death of Tina Fontaine, Virago, 2019
The 2017 awards were judged by Richard Holmes (Chair), Afua Hirsch and Fiona St Aubyn.

References

Royal Society of Literature awards
Awards established in 2017
2017 establishments in the United Kingdom
British non-fiction literary awards
Literary awards honoring unpublished books or writers